Villa del Totoral is a town in the province of Córdoba, Argentina.

References

 

Populated places in Córdoba Province, Argentina
Cities in Argentina
Argentina
Córdoba Province, Argentina